Talkh Ab may refer to various places in Iran:
 Talkh Ab, Bushehr
 Talkh Ab-e Riz, Bushehr Province
 Talkh Ab, Jahrom, Fars Province
 Talkh Ab, Kazerun, Fars Province
 Talkh Ab-e Valad, Mamasani County, Fars Province
 Talkh Ab, Ilam
 Talkh Ab-e Ahmadzadeh, Kohgiluyeh and Boyer-Ahmad Province
 Talkh Ab-e Pain, Kohgiluyeh and Boyer-Ahmad Province
 Talkh Ab-e Shirin, Kohgiluyeh and Boyer-Ahmad Province
 Talkh Ab, Markazi
 Talkh Ab, Zanjan
 Talkh Ab-e Zardpatak, Khuzestan Province
 Talkh Ab Rural District, in Markazi Province

See also
 Talkhab (disambiguation), various places in Iran